Vincenzo Savio (6 April 1944 – 31 March 2004) was an Italian Roman Catholic bishop who served as the Bishop of Belluno-Feltre.

Hailed as a pious and spiritual pastor, there have been calls for his canonization and to date he is recognized as a Servant of God.

Life
Vincenzo Savio was born in Osio Sotto on 6 April 1944 to Augustus Savio and Santina Arnoldi as the sixth of seven children. He was an intellectual and his talents melded with his religious vocation led him to commence his studies for the priesthood on 26 September 1955.

He was admitted to the novitiate of the Salesians of Don Bosco and made his religious profession on 16 August 1961. He took his perpetual vows in 1967. He also completed his philosophical studies and obtained a diploma in science. He undertook theological courses in Rome and obtained a licentiate in 1972 as a result of his theological studies.

He was ordained to the priesthood in Rome on 25 March 1972. He served as a parish priest in Livorno from 1977 to 1985 and he collaborated when it came to episcopal conferences in Livorno. He would return to Rome in 1985 to present a thesis but decided to reject the academic career he once held in high esteem. In 1990 he was made the governor of the Salesian Provincial Chapter.

Pope John Paul II appointed him as the Titular Bishop of Garrisana on 14 April 1993 and also appointed him to a post in Livorno. He received episcopal consecration in 1993 before he embarked for Livorno.

John Paul II later appointed him as the Bishop of Belluno-Feltre on 9 December 2000. He was installed several weeks later and dedicated his first moments to the sick. On 26 August 2001 he celebrated mass for the pontifical election of the late Pope John Paul I – who reigned a mere month in 1978 – and also celebrated mass on 28 September for the late pope.

Savio visited Brazil in mid 2001 and undertook a pilgrimage to Lourdes in September. On 18 October 2001 he read a papal document that saw a church raised to the rank of Minor Basilica. In 2003 he began to assemble documentation for the cause of canonization of Pope John Paul I – the cause was opened on 23 November 2003.

His health started to decline at a rapid pace around Christmas in 2003 and was operated on at the beginning of 2004. He was admitted to hospital in March 2004 and he received the last rites on 27 March.

Vincenzo Savio died on 31 March 2004 at 8:42am with his sisters and niece at his bedside.

Beatification process
There had been calls for a canonization process for Savio which is under investigation. He has the title of Servant of God.

References

External links
Catholic Hierarchy
Hagiography Circle

1944 births
2004 deaths
20th-century venerated Christians
21st-century venerated Christians
Clergy from the Province of Bergamo
Italian Servants of God
Salesians of Don Bosco
Salesian bishops
20th-century Italian Roman Catholic bishops
21st-century Italian Roman Catholic bishops